Kodi may refer to:

Arts, entertainment, and media
 KODI, a radio station in Cody, Wyoming, USA
 Kodi (film), India, 2016
 Kodi, a dog in the 2004 film Balto III: Wings of Change

Other uses 
 Kodi (software), an open source media player
 Kodi, India, a village
 Kodi language, a Sumba language of Indonesia
 Kodi Smit-McPhee (born 1996), Australian actor

See also
 Cody (disambiguation)